= Hamburger Theaternacht =

Hamburger Theaternacht is a theatre festival in Germany. The series of events has existed since 2004 and is organized by the Hamburger Theater e.V. association.
